London's Trafalgar Square is an 1890 British short silent actuality film, shot by inventors and film pioneers Wordsworth Donisthorpe and William Carr Crofts at approximately 10 frames per second with an oval or circular frame on celuloid film using their 'kinesigraph' camera, showing traffic at Trafalgar Square in London. The surviving ten frames of film are the earliest known motion picture of the city.

References

External links
 
 

1890 films
1890s British films
British black-and-white films
British silent short films
Films set in London
Films shot in London
1890 short films